Gregory Lenard Lloyd II (born February 10, 1989) is a former American football linebacker. He was drafted by the Philadelphia Eagles in the seventh round of the 2011 NFL Draft. He played college football at Connecticut.

Lloyd is the son of former Pittsburgh Steelers linebacker Greg Lloyd Sr.

Professional career

Philadelphia Eagles
Lloyd was drafted by the Philadelphia Eagles in the seventh round of the 2011 NFL Draft. After getting released during final roster cuts on September 3, 2011, he was re-signed to the team's practice squad on September 4. He was promoted to the active roster on November 29.

Indianapolis Colts
The Eagles traded Lloyd and Moise Fokou to the Indianapolis Colts on August 2, 2012, in exchange for Kevin Thomas and a conditional seventh round draft pick in 2013. He was waived by the Colts during final cuts on August 31, 2012.

Buffalo Bills
Lloyd was signed to the Buffalo Bills practice squad on November 21, 2012. He was signed to the active roster on December 30, 2012. He was released on June 5, 2013.

References

External links
 
 Buffalo Bills bio
 Indianapolis Colts bio
 Philadelphia Eagles bio
 Connecticut Huskies bio

1989 births
Living people
People from Clermont, Florida
Players of American football from Florida
American football defensive ends
American football linebackers
UConn Huskies football players
Philadelphia Eagles players
Indianapolis Colts players
Buffalo Bills players